The 2013 European Athletics Team Championships Super League was the Super League of the 4th edition of the European Athletics Team Championships (European Team Championships until 2011 edition), the 2013 European Athletics Team Championships, which took place on 22 and 23 June 2013 in Gateshead, Great Britain. As with the previous championships there were a couple of rules applying specifically to this competition, such as the limit of three attempts in the throwing events, long jump and triple jump (only the top four were allowed the fourth attempt) and the limit of four misses total in the high jump and pole vault.

Final standings

Note: The competition was originally won by Russia but after doping disqualification of Yekaterina Sharmina and points being reallocated it was overtaken by Germany and Great Britain.

Men

100 metres 
Wind:Heat 1: -0.5 m/sHeat 2: -4.1 m/s

200 metres 
Wind:Heat 1: +1.7 m/sHeat 2: +2.4 m/s

400 metres

800 metres

1500 metres

3000 metres

5000 metres

3000 metres steeplechase

110 metres hurdles 
Wind:Heat 1: +1.3 m/sHeat 2: +2.4 m/s

400 metres hurdles

4 × 100 metres relay

4 × 400 metres relay

High jump

Pole vault

Long jump

Triple jump

Shot put

Discus throw

Hammer throw

Javelin throw

Women

100 metres 
Wind:Heat 1: -4.6 m/sHeat 2: -4.3 m/s

200 metres 
Wind:Heat 1: -1.8 m/sHeat 2: -2.8 m/s

400 metres

800 metres

1500 metres

3000 metres

5000 metres

3000 metres steeplechase

100 metres hurdles 
Wind:Heat 1: +1.9 m/sHeat 2: +2.6 m/s

400 metres hurdles

4 × 100 metres relay

4 × 400 metres relay

High jump

Pole vault

Long jump

Triple jump

Shot put

Discus throw

Hammer throw

Javelin throw

Score table

References

Ecternal links
 Results
 Updated results

European Athletics Team Championships Super League
European
European Team Championships Super League
European Team Championships Super League
Sport in Tyne and Wear
21st century in Tyne and Wear
International athletics competitions hosted by England